Ioan Popovici may refer to:
Ioan Popovici (brigadier general) (1865–1953), Romanian general
Ioan Popovici (divisional general) (1857–?), Romanian general
Ioan Popovici-Bănățeanul (1869–1893), Romanian poet